St. Mary's High School Secunderabad is a co-educational, catholic school located at St. Francis Road, Secunderabad, Telangana, India. It is one of the oldest schools of the country. It offers schooling from L.K.G. to Standard X under Secondary School Certificate program.
Noted for its physical education department, the School has National Cadet Corps (India) Air-wing and Army Groups, including association football and cricket training. Though the school is Catholic Minority Institution, admission is based on interview performance for all students irrespective of caste, creed and religion.

History 
St. Mary's High School is one of the oldest schools in Secunderabad. It was established in 1885 and is managed by the Hyderabad Archdiocese Educational Society (HAES). Fr. Valentino Bigi was the first principal of the school. The school is run by the Roman Catholic Order. The school formerly admitted only boys but has become co-educational. The school has four houses which are named after the first four principals of the School - Bigi (Yellow), Marian (Blue), Vas (Red) and Fernandez (Green).

Divisions 
 Kindergarten     - Lower KG and Upper KG
 Primary School   - from Class 1 to 5 (Grade 1 to 5)
 Secondary School - from Class 6 to 7 (Grade 6 to 7)
 High School      - Classes 8 to 10  (Grades 8 to 10)
Each class has four sections A,B,C,D based on the choice of first language.

Curriculum 
The academic year starts in June and ends in April and is divided into three quarters. Exams will be held in the end of every month and every quarter. The school gives holidays after each quarter and a long summer vacation after each curricular year. At the end of Class 10, the State Government-based SSC Board Examinations will be held.

Extra-curricular and co-curricular activities 
Widely known for its physical education department, students enjoy various extra and co curricular activities. Each year, the school celebrates many functions like Teacher's Day, Children's Day, Christmas Celebrations, Independence and Republic Day celebrations.

The school celebrates Annual Day functions, Inter-school sports competitions, science exhibitions, and various cultural activities. The School has National Cadet Corps (India) Air-wing and Army Groups, selected by the Physical Instructors of the school. The school is known for its football and cricket training.

School Anthem 
We belong to a happy family St. Mary's, St. Mary's. We do have houses all in four Yellow, Blue, Red and Green.

Duty is our prime concern, Mingled with our service. Purity in body, and mind Make all things divine.

We present to you our school motto Duty, Service, Purity. With truth and love we strive to live For ever and ever.

May good God bless our endeavour And fill our hearts with blessings. May his choicest graces be on us The member of St. Mary's.

Notable alumni 
Ram Gopal Verma

Facilities 
 Auditorium
 Science Laboratories
 Computer Lab
 Library
 Residential hostel(with boarding and dining)
 NCC

References

Official Facebook Page 
 www.facebook.com/smhshyd

Catholic secondary schools in India
Primary schools in India
Christian schools in Telangana
Schools in Secunderabad
Private schools in Hyderabad, India
High schools and secondary schools in Hyderabad, India
Educational institutions established in 1885
1885 establishments in India